Groover's Paradise is an album by Doug Sahm, produced by musician Doug Clifford and released on Warner Records in 1974. Following his return to Texas after his success with the Sir Douglas Quintet in California, Sahm settled in Austin, Texas. As the local music scene thrived, he was featured as the main attraction in local clubs and he recorded his debut album for Atlantic Records.

In California, Sahm became acquainted with the members of Creedence Clearwater Revival, and he signed an agreement with Clifford and Stu Cook to record for their production company after his second Atlantic release was unsuccessful. Groover's Paradise found success in Austin, but it failed to chart on a national level. Meanwhile, it was favored by the critics.

Background
After a drug arrest in Corpus Christi, Texas in 1965, Doug Sahm left Texas to move to California. With the Sir Douglas Quintet, he made hit records, and he performed in San Francisco venues as the hippie scene grew. Sahm left California in 1971 to return to his home in San Antonio, Texas, and he then moved the same year to Austin, Texas. By the early 1970s, the musical scene of Austin soared. Due to the city's low cost of living, between 1972 and 1974, 200 musicians moved to Austin. Sixty-five bands were based around the area, while there were twenty-eight night clubs. The Ritz theater was re-opened to host large shows, as  Willie Nelson, Waylon Jennings and Jerry Jeff Walker found major success. 

Sahm made appearances at the Armadillo World Headquarters and the Soap Creek Saloon. The Armadillo World Headquarters became a popular club, with a crowd constituted by country music fans, hippies and students. Sahm was often featured as the main attraction of the club. In 1972, he disbanded the Sir Douglas Quintet. He was signed by Jerry Wexler to Atlantic Records, and he released his debut solo album in 1973: Doug Sahm and Band.

Recording

During his time in California, Sahm befriended members of Creedence Clearwater Revival. In 1974, following a second unsuccessful album release with Atlantic Records, Sahm traveled to Berkeley, California to record the single "Groover's Paradise". He signed a contract with DSR Productions, owned by former Credence Clearwater Revival members Doug Clifford (drummer) and Stu Cook (bassist). The company had an agreement with Warner Records to record Sahm and to provide them with the masters. Sahm was backed by a band dubbed the Tex -Mex Trip. The band included saxophonist Frank Rodarte, session musician Link Davis, Jr. and Los Angeles session musicians. Clifford produced the album and joined the band on drums, while Cook played the bass. All the songs of the album were written by Sahm, except Luis Guerrero's "La Cacahuata". Groover's Paradise was recorded at Cosmo's Factory studio in Berkeley, California. The record sleeve featured art by Kerry Awn, while the armadillos were drawn by Jim Franklin. The cover depicted "various well-known local scenes" of Austin. The recording of Groover's Paradise took place between May and June 1974. The recording featured a blend of country music, tejano, blues and rock.

Release and reception

The single "Groover's Paradise" was released in July 1974. Backed with "Girls Today (Don't Like to Sleep Alone)", it was cataloged under WB 7819. The album was released in August 1974, and Sahm begun a national tour to promote it. Upon its release, Groover's Paradise became a hit in Austin, but it failed to succeed in other cities. 

United Press International called it "the best thing Doug has done in quite a while", and attributed it to Clifford's work as a producer. the Austin American-Statesman favored the album, as the reviewer considered it was performed with "finesse and simplicity". Critic Robert Christgau gave the album a B+ grade. Christgau considered Sahm a "master whose core simplicity is completely unassailable".
AllMusic gave Groover's Paradise four-and-a-half stars out of five. Critic Eugene Chadbourne opined: "the tracks indicate a mastery of many basic forms such as blues, rhythm & blues, norteño, country, and Cajun and the players always seem to be probing beyond this to find something new." Meanwhile, Austin Chronicle deemed it "the quintessential Austin album" and called its cover art "the ultimate hippie version of Austin". Texas Monthly considered that the album captured Austin's "insouciant essence" as a "carefree hippie mecca".

Track listing

Personnel

Musicians

Doug Sahm - vocals, guitar, bajo sexto
Link Davis, Jr. - vocals, fiddle, piano, organ, alto and tenor saxophone
Frank Rodarte - alto and tenor saxophone, flute, vocals
Doug Clifford - drums
Stu Cook - bass, guitar
Gary Potterton - steel guitar
Ron Stawlings - tenor saxophone
John Wilmeth - trumpet
Johnny Rae - marimba
The Valley Boys - backup vocals
The Stovalls - backup vocals

Studio
Doug Clifford - producer
Malory Earl - sound engineer
John Flores - sound engineer
Russ Gary - sound engineer

References

Sources

 

 
 
 
 
 
 
 

 

 
 

 
 

 

1974 albums
Doug Sahm albums
Warner Records albums